In the United States, the 2004 Alabama Democratic presidential primary (held June 1) was one of the last remaining tests of some of the leading contenders for the Democratic Party's nomination as its candidate for the 2004 presidential election.

Analysis 

By this primary, John Kerry already secured the nomination. He easily won with 75% of the vote, including every county and congressional district. The largest turnout by far came from Jefferson County, Alabama, where Kerry won with almost 92%. Also at roll call at the convention, Carol Moseley-Braun received 7 delegate votes despite not being on the ballot in the Alabama state primary.

Results

References 

Democratic primary
Alabama
2004